Angelarctocyon is an extinct genus of Amphicyonidae (bear dog), which belongs to the order Carnivora.

It was originally interpreted as a miacid and named Miacis australis, however recent research has suggested it is an early amphicyonid. Analysis of skeletal morphology suggests it is most closely related to another taxon previously attributed to Miacidae, Miacis cognitus, and the well known New World amphicyonid, Daphoenus.

References

Bear dogs
Eocene mammals of North America
Fossil taxa described in 2016
Prehistoric carnivoran genera